The Ecuadorian Air Force (FAE) is the air branch of the Armed Forces of Ecuador.

Mission
To develop the military air wing, in order to execute institutional objectives which guarantee sovereignty and contribute towards the nation's security and development.

Vision
To be a dissuasive Air Force, respected and accepted by society, pioneering within the nation's "air-space" development.

History
The FAE was officially created on October 27, 1920. However, like in many other countries, military flying activity started before the formal date of birth of the Air Force. The history of Ecuador is marked by many skirmishes with its neighbour Peru. As a direct result of the 1910 Ecuador-Peru crisis the members of  decided to expand their sporting activities into aviation as well. Renamed , they started an aviation school. In 1912  was sent to his native Italy for training where he successfully graduated as a pilot. He later returned to Europe a second time in 1915, where he participated in World War I.  In 152 combat sorties he scored 18 victories, although only 7 were confirmed. When he returned to Ecuador, his experiences served as motivation for a reduced group of Ecuadorian pilots, who moved to the Aviation School in Turin, Italy, with the objective of graduating as the first Ecuadorian pilots of the nascent Ecuadorian Military Aviation.

By 1939 the Ecuadorian Air Force was still limited to about 30 aircraft and a staff of about 60, including 10 officers. Military aviation did not start in earnest until the early forties when an Ecuadorian mission to the United States resulted in the delivery of an assortment of aircraft for the Aviation school at Salinas.

The 1950s and 1960s saw a further necessary buildup of the air force, gaining more units and aircraft. Meanwhile, efforts were made in enhancing the facilities at various airbases. In May 1961 the "First Air Zone" with its subordinate unit  was founded.

Besides the military transport aircraft, it also uses commercial airliners. Flying to locations off the beaten track, TAME provides an additional service to the people of Ecuador.

The FAE saw action on several occasions. A continuous border dispute with Peru flared up in 1981 and 1995. Today the FAE faces the war on drugs as well as many humanitarian and logistic missions into the Amazon-region of the country. Nevertheless, being a middle-income country and supporting a relatively large air force is a burden.

Structure

This is the current structure of the Ecuadorian Air Force:

21 Combat Wing - Taura Air Base
2112 Combat Squadron "Cheetah" - operating Atlas Cheetah
22 Combat Wing - Simon Bolivar Air Base
2211 Combat Squadron - operating Cessna 206
2212 Combat Squadron - operating TH-57
23 Combat Wing - Eloy Alfaro Air Base
2311 Combat Squadron "Dragons" - operating A-29 Super Tucano
11 Transport Wing - Cotopaxi Air Base (part of Latacunga International Airport)
1111 Transport Squadron "Hercules" - operating C-130H/L100-30
1112 Transport Squadron "Avro" - operating CASA 295
1113 Transport Squadron "Twin Otter" - operating DHC-6 Twin Otter
1114 Transport Squadron "Sabreliner" - operating Sabreliner
Air Force Academy "Cosme Rennella" - Salinas Air Base - operating Diamond DA20

Aircraft

Current inventory

Retired
Previous notable aircraft flown included the  Republic P-47,  PBY Catalina, BAC Strikemaster,  English Electric Canberra, Hawker Siddeley HS 748,  SEPECAT Jaguar, Lockheed T-33, T-28 Trojan, H-13 Sioux,  and the HAL Dhruv helicopter

Air Defense

See also
Military of Ecuador

References

External links

 

Air forces by country
Air Force
Aviation in Ecuador
Military units and formations established in 1920